The Tasimiidae is a family of Trichoptera, erected in 1968 (Riek). The family is found in Australia and Chile. The genera Tricovespula was originally placed in the Lepidostomatidae, but it was placed in the Tasmiidae by Flint (1969). Tasimiidae is the only family in the superfamily Tasimioidea.

Characteristics
All members are identified by the following characteristics:
head rounded, eyes bulging
head and pronotum sclerotised
pronotum with anterolateral corners rounded or acute
posterior flange broad or narrow
mesonotum with pair of large sclerites
metanotum with 2 pairs of small sclerites
abdomen with strongly developed lateral fringe of setae
abdominal gills present
Total length: 5 to 6 mm
Case: Dorsoventrally flattened made of small stones, with ventral opening

Genera
Charadropsyche Chile
Charadropsyche penicillata
Trichovespula Chile
Trichovespula macrocera
Tasimia Australia
Tasimia atra
Tasimia denticulata
Tasimia drepana
Tasimia natasia 
Tasimia palpata
Tasiagma Australia
Tasiagma ciliata

References

Trichoptera families
Integripalpia